The 1988 Ohio State Buckeyes football team represented the Ohio State University in the 1988 NCAA Division I-A football season.  It was the first season for head coach John Cooper.  The Buckeyes played their home games in Ohio Stadium. The team finished the season with a win–loss record of 4–6–1, and a Big Ten Conference record of 2–5–1.

Schedule

Personnel

Season summary

Syracuse

Pittsburgh

LSU

Illinois

Indiana

Purdue

Minnesota

Michigan State

Wisconsin

Iowa

Michigan

1989 NFL draftees

References

Ohio State
Ohio State Buckeyes football seasons
Ohio State Buckeyes football